Louetta is an unincorporated community in Harris County, Texas, United States that used to be a distinct community.

The town was dissolved in 1946.

Education
Klein Independent School District operates schools in the area.

External links

http://www.tshaonline.org/handbook/online/articles/htl20

Unincorporated communities in Harris County, Texas
Unincorporated communities in Texas